Wildlife rehabilitation is the treatment and care of injured, orphaned, or sick wild animals so that they can be released back to the wild.

Process

Rehabilitation begins when an animal is found and reported to a wildlife rehabilitator, or seized from the illegal wildlife trade or a poacher. If you find wildlife in need of rescue, it can be dangerous or even illegal to interact with the animal yourself; be sure to contact a licensed rehabilitator before taking action.

The rehabilitator will examine the animal to determine the extent of the injury and the probability of successful rehabilitation. If it appears that the animal can make a sufficient recovery to be able to return to the wild, the animal will be fed, nurtured, provided safe temporary housing, and medically treated as necessary.

Animals that cannot be rehabilitated are usually euthanized humanely, although animals are occasionally placed at facilities appropriately licensed for educational exhibit or brought into appropriate lifetime care in a wildlife rescue center.

The goal of wildlife rehabilitation is to safely return the animal back to its home, but this is not always the case. A non-releasable animal may sometimes be kept by the rehabilitator (under separate permit) as a surrogate parent for orphaned or injured young wildlife.

Preventing imprinting and habituation is important in the rehabilitation process. Imprinting occurs when a young animal, specifically young birds, begin to see the rehabilitator as their primary caregiver. It is possible to reverse this process in most animals, but it is permanent with birds. Rehabilitators have to take caution when caring for young animals in order to avoid this. It is critical to establish maintain boundaries between the rehabilitator and the animal. This includes wearing a mask and gloves around animals or even covering an animal's cage with a towel to prevent contact with humans.

General Rescue Information

If you find injured or juvenile wildlife, consider if it actually needs or can be helped.

If an adult allows you to approach, either because it is too injured or weakened to flee, they need care. Never try to capture adult wildlife, always contact a licensed rehabilitator.

Juveniles often do not need “rescue”, be sure to watch from a distance before you make a decision to intervene. In many cases the parent is nearby but will not approach when there are people around. It is always best for juveniles to be raised by their parent(s). 
If they are injured, sick, or cold they need care. Do not try to raise the animal on your own, always contact a licensed rehabilitator.

If you do need to capture a juvenile animal for transport to a rehabilitation center, prepare ahead of time, and be as gentle as possible. 
Have a carrier or box ready, there should be enough room for the animal to move a bit, but not so much they can hurt themselves. Line the carrier or box with fabric (avoid things with threads, loops, strings, or carpet: animals can get caught or ingest), and cover any areas the animal can see out of. This creates a "den" the animals can feel hidden and secure in. 
Be sure to wear gloves when handling wildlife, all animals are capable of hurting you, no matter their size or age. 
Only use nets, sheets, towels, or pillowcases to catch the animal.  
When restraining the animal be firm, but do not hinder breathing. Be mindful of any visible injuries (do not grab by their injured wing, leg, etc.) Always cover the animal's head to reduce stress and prevent injury.
Minimizing stress is critical, once you have caught the juvenile allow it a little time to recover in its "den". Place the carrier or box a quiet, dark, scent-free place before you do anything further. Engage in as little human contact and handling as possible; the animal likely considers you a predator, and will be further stressed with each interaction.

Animals that are young, or badly injured will benefit from a source of warmth. Create a heat source, but never put the source of warmth in direct contact with the animal. Possible heat sources include: a heating pad (on low) under half of the box/carrier, a microwaved small bag (old sock) filled with dry rice or beans, a warm bottle of water, or hand warmer packs placed under bedding.

Do not give the animal food or water. Providing the animal with food and water is rarely the top priority and in some cases is to be strongly avoided (when it is injured, emaciated, or cold).

Once you have the juvenile set up with a source of warmth in its secluded place, contact your local wildlife rehabilitator for further instructions.

Background

The field of wildlife rehabilitation varies from small scale operations of individuals working from their homes, usually working with a veterinarian; to professionally staffed wildlife hospitals. Some organizations are teaching wildlife hospitals: Tristate Bird Rescue, Paws Wildlife Center, the Wildlife Center of Virginia, and The Clinic for Rehabilitation of Wildlife provide training to veterinary students from around the world, and offer one-year postdoctoral internships in clinical wildlife medicine.  Other facilities are affiliated with universities, such as the Amos Rehabilitation Keep (ARK) at the University of Texas Marine Science Institute.

Another type of wildlife rehabilitator is the Senkwekwe Centre in Virunga National Park in the Democratic Republic of Congo, which cares for the only two orphan baby mountain gorillas in captivity. Their rescue and subsequent survival is considered an important contribution to the conservation of a critically endangered species.

Many wildlife rehabilitators and centers are also committed to improving the well-being of wildlife though public education; focusing on how humans can safely and peacefully coexist with native wildlife, and on wildlife's importance to humans and the environment. Wildlife rehabilitation clinics can also often offer advice and guidance on humane solutions for "nuisance" wildlife concerns.

Legal issues
In many countries, including the United States and Australia, wildlife rehabilitation requires a license and/or permit. In these countries, it is against the law to rehabilitate (or in some cases possess) a wild animal without permits. In the United States, rehabilitation permits, requirements, and procedures for all animals other than birds vary from state to state.Rehabilitation of birds in the U.S. requires, per the Migratory Bird Treaty Act, that a permit be obtained from both the state wildlife agency and the United States Fish and Wildlife Service. The only birds rehabilitators can admit without a federal permit are common birds considered to be introduced invasive species: rock doves, European starlings, and house sparrows; although some licensed rehabilitation facilities cannot accept introduced species as a condition of their licensing.

There a number of regulations in place when it comes to wildlife rehabilitation. States require a license in order to work as a wildlife rehabilitator. In certain states, such as North Dakota, you must be a licensed veterinarian if you want to work in wildlife rehabilitation. Rehabbers must go through a lot of training before they obtain their wildlife rehabilitation license.

Services provided by wildlife rehabilitators 
 Lessens biologists workload.
 Ensure humane and professional care of injured animals.
 Provides great help to professional wildlife handlers to help WDFW with wildlife cope-up with emergencies.
 Provides data and staff-power for areas of wildlife research and retrospective studies.
 Specialized in threat and endangered species recovery.
 Assists in monitoring disease and domestic animal protection and public health.
 Provides self-regulation and self-enforcement within the wildlife rehabilitator community.
 Provides valuable public education and clear understanding regarding securement of wildlife community and its necessary motives.

See also
 Wildlife rehabilitation and conservation centers
 Among The Great Apes With Michelle Yeoh (documentary film about the Sepilok Orang Utan Sanctuary)

References

External links

Wildlife rescue organizations
 Philadelphia Metro Wildlife Center (Pennsylvania)
Orphaned Wildlife Rescue Center-Maryland
National Wildlife Rehabilitators Association
International Wildlife Rehabilitation Council
British Wildlife Rehabilitation Council
 Suncoast Seabird Sanctuary (Florida)
St. Tiggywinkles
Tri-State Bird Rescue (Delaware)
California Council for Wildlife Rehabilitators
Lindsay Wildlife Museum and Wildlife Hospital, Walnut Creek (N. California)
Wildlife Rehabilitation Center of Minnesota
 PAWS Wildlife Center (Washington)
C.R.O.W. Wildlife Clinic
Center for Animal Rehabilitation and Education, South Africa
 Carolina Raptor Center (North Carolina)
Wild Things Sanctuary (New York)
Animal Advocates Wildlife Rehabilitation
Second Chance Wildlife Center (Maryland)
 Wildlife Center of Virginia
Free Again Wildlife Rehabilitation (Illinois)
Blue Ridge Wildlife Center (Virginia)
WildCare BayArea, San Rafael (N. California) 
Valley Forge Native Wildlife Refuge (Scotland)
Directory of British Wildlife Rehabilitators
Directory of Australian Wildlife Rehabilitation Associations
Volunteer South Africa Endangered Wildlife Rehabilitation and Breeding Centre
Red Creek Wildlife Center, Inc. (Pennsylvania)
Wildlife Rescue Association of B.C.
Genesis Zoological and Wildlife Rescue  (Florida)
Wild Baby Rescue Center (New Jersey)
Wildlife Rapid Rescue Team - Wildlife Alliance 
Ohio Wildlife Rehabilitators Association
Vermont Institute of Natural Science
Florida Wildlife Hospital & Sanctuary
Center for Wildlife (Maine)
Sacred Friends Inc (Virginia)
Scottish Society for the Prevention of Cruelty to Animals (SSPCA) National Wildlife Rescue Centre  (Scotland)
Wolf Hollow Wildlife Rehabilitation Center (Washington)
AWARE Wildlife Center (Georgia)

Information
Publication for the public when they find wildlife in distress
I Found An Animal
Rescuing Wildlife - A Guide to Helping Injured and Orphaned Animals
 Wildlife Rehabilitation Manual
Rehabilitation of baby ground squirrels
Rehabilitation of baby tree squirrels
Rehabilitation of baby striped skunks
USFWS Migratory Bird Permits

 
Animal welfare
Abandoned animals